Kunming Wujiaba International Airport  was the main airport serving Kunming, the capital of Yunnan Province, China. Originally built in 1923, the airport had been renovated numerous times into a modern facility before closing on 28 June 2012. It was a major hub for China Eastern Airlines, Kunming Airlines, and Lucky Air. The airport has been replaced by the new Kunming Changshui International Airport. As of 2021, Wujiaba Airport has been demolished and the land will be fully redeveloped before the end of 2021.

History 

Wujiaba is among the oldest airports in China, with a history that can be traced back to about 100 years, and was first established into a military airbase and flight-training institute under the supervision of local warlord General Tang Jiyao in 1922; an additional 23 airports would be established in Yunnan from 1922-1929.

The Sino-Japanese War was the beginning of World War II in Asia, and following the Battles of Shanghai and Nanjing, the Chinese Central Air Force Academy had to be relocated from Jianqiao Airbase to the expanded Wujiaba Airport. After a few years of support of the Chinese Air Force under the Sino-Soviet Cooperation in the War of Resistance against the Empire of Japan, the United States began to show earnest support for China's war effort with the oil embargo and asset freezing against Japan in 1941, and Wujiaba became the base for the "legendary Flying Tigers", the American Volunteer Group (AVG) of combat airmen serving in the Chinese Air Force, led by Claire Lee Chennault just before the United States entered the war. After the US entered the war in December 1941, and starting in 1942, Wujiaba Airport was the headquarters of numerous United States Army Air Forces units, including the Fourteenth Air Force and later the Tenth Air Force.

The USAAF Air Transport Command (ATC) established a major air transport facility  at the airport, which connected flights west to Chabua Airfield, India, with other routes within China Jiangbei Airport (Chunking); Chengtu Air Base, and Banmaw Airport (Bhamo, Burma). After the war ended in 1945, a 1,390-mile (2,224 kilometer) route east to Clark Air Base in the Philippines was established.   The route to Clark AB established a complete worldwide transport route for ATC.

The Flying Tigers Association visited in October 1982 and again in September 2005.

Other facilities
Before merging into China Eastern Airlines, China Yunnan Airlines had its head office was located at the airport.

Images

See also

List of airports in China
List of the busiest airports in China
 Chengkung Airfield

Notes

References

 

Defunct airports in China
Airports established in 1923
Airports disestablished in 2012
1923 establishments in China
2012 disestablishments in China
Airports in Yunnan
Transport in Kunming
Airfields of the United States Army Air Forces in China
Airfields of the United States Army Air Forces Air Transport Command in the China-Burma-India Theater
Flying Tigers